Roma called Roy  was High Priest of Amun during the Nineteenth Dynasty of Egypt, at the end of the reign of Ramesses II and continued into the reigns of Merenptah and likely Seti II. Roma served as third and second priest of Amun and finally as first prophet (high priest) of Amun. He was also a count (h3ty-a), a prince (iry-pat) and a divine father pure of hands.

Roma's wife Tamut is mentioned in his tomb, while a wife named Tabest is named on a stele in Leiden.

Stele 
Also known is the stele from Leiden (Netherlands), which bears an inscription from Roma called Roy, and was once located on the east side of the eighth pylon of the Karnak temple. It is an important source of the history of the 19th dynasty. Contains information about the rise of the Theban priesthood, the introduction of the royal dynasty of the Ipui clan in Thebes. From the Roma called Roy inscription:

"Let my son take my place. And my office will be in his hands. And may it pass from father to son forever, as a just and useful man does in his master's house."

Burial
Roma called Roy was buried in TT283 in Dra' Abu el-Naga'.

References

Theban High Priests of Amun
People of the Nineteenth Dynasty of Egypt
13th-century BC clergy
Ramesses II
Year of birth unknown
Year of death unknown